Bülbülə (also, Byul’byuli, Byul’byulya, and Byulbyuti) is a municipality in Baku, Azerbaijan.  It has a population of 17,105.

Notable natives 

 Avaz Verdiyev — Hero of the Soviet Union.

References 

Municipalities of Baku